Sky Shadow is a 1990 Defender clone for the Mac OS, published by Casady & Greene. It was programmed by Patrick Buckland, author of the classic Mac Game Crystal Quest. In 1994 it was licensed from Casady & Greene by MacSoft and re-released for System 7 on CD-ROM.

Reception

Sky Shadow was critically acclaimed when originally released, featuring detailed graphics and fast-paced gameplay. It received the top score of five mice from MacUser magazine and was inducted into the Macworld magazine "Game Hall of Fame" as the Best Shoot-'em-up game of 1990.

Macworld praised Sky Shadow's graphics and sound effects as well as its gameplay, stating that "Sky Shadow is an engaging, fun, and highly addictive game". Macworld criticized its stability, stating it "often crashes", as well as its "severe penalties for minor mistakes" in that it's easy to die, whereupon the player loses all their points.

References

External links 
 Sky Shadow at GameFAQs

1990 video games
Classic Mac OS-only games
Classic Mac OS games
Horizontally scrolling shooters
Video game clones
Video games developed in the United Kingdom
MacSoft games